Baiyer Rural LLG is a local-level government (LLG) of Western Highlands Province, Papua New Guinea.

Wards
01. Pokotapugl
02. Manjip
03. Sanap
04. Keluape.1
05. Keluape.2
06. Lyaporambo.2
07. Lyaporambo.1
08. Kaleta
09. Kuipbaut.1
10. Kuipbaut.2
11. Rolga
12. Endeman
13. Jukuna
14. Tapikama.1
15. Tapikama.2
16. Kaliponga
17. Yaramanda.1
18. Yaramanda.2
19. Yaramanda.3
20. Pakalts.1
21. Pakalts.2
22. Dalapana.1
23. Dalapana.2
24. Dalapana.3
25. Kulimbu.1
26. Kulimbu.2
27. Mandawasa.1
28. Mandawasa 2
29. Kalepale
30. Simunga
31. Kanan.1
32. Kanan.2
33. Yakasmanda.1
34. Yakasmanda.2
35. Iki 1
36. Iki 2
37. Dekenapona
38. Antengena. 1
39. Keld
40. Gelg.1
41. Gelg.2
42. Kul
43. Pila
44. Opa
45. Ruti
46. Tinsley Health Centre
47. Baiyer Station

References

Local-level governments of Western Highlands Province